Charles T. Harmon (born 1979), better known as Chuck Harmony, is an American music producer, musician, songwriter and entrepreneur, based in Nashville, Tennessee. He is a three-time Grammy Award nominee, and won a 2011 NAACP Image Award for Outstanding Song for Fantasia’s "Bittersweet".

Early life
Harmon was born and raised in East St. Louis, Illinois. He grew up performing in church. At age 4, he learned to play the drums, which quickly led to Harmon playing the trombone, tuba, piano, in addition to singing in the church choir. He studied music at Alabama State University, where he took piano lessons with the goal of becoming a jazz pianist. After college, he relocated to Atlanta, Georgia.

Career

Songwriting and producing (2007-present)
Harmon's first major songwriting credit was as a co-writer alongside Ne-Yo on Celine Dion's "I Got Nothin' Left" from her 2007 album Taking Chances. He has since earned production, composition, songwriting and instrumentation credits on songs by artists including Ne-Yo, Toni Braxton, Mary J. Blige, Jennifer Hudson, Janet Jackson, John Legend, Rihanna, Kelly Rowland,  Anthony Hamilton, Johnny Gill, Keyshia Cole, Keri Hilson, K'naan, Bono and Corinne Bailey Rae.
  
Harmony was nominated for a 2009 Grammy Award for Album of the Year for co-producing Ne-Yo's Year of the Gentleman; for Best R&B Song at the 2011 Grammy Awards for co-writing Fantasia’s "Bittersweet"; and for Best R&B Song at the 2012 Grammy Awards for co-writing Ledisi's "Pieces of Me". He won a 2011 NAACP Image Award for Outstanding Song for "Bittersweet". He produced "Work in Progress (Growing Pains)" on Mary J. Blige's album Growing Pains, which won the 2009 Grammy Award for Best Contemporary R&B Album. He and Ne-Yo wrote and produced Rihanna's "Russian Roulette", the lead single from her 2009 album Rated R. He produced the single "One in a Million" from Ne-Yo's 2010 album Libra Scale, and produced and co-wrote Keri Hilson's 2010 single "Pretty Girl Rock".

Louis York (2015-present)
Harmony and Claude Kelly met while working on R&B singer Chrisette Michele's 2009 album Epiphany. They went on to write and produce together for artists including Bruno Mars, Miley Cyrus, Britney Spears, Jessie J, Faith Evans, Ledisi and Fantasia.

In 2015, Harmony and Kelly formed the progressive band Louis York. Their debut EP, Masterpiece Theater – Act I, was released in 2015. Harmony plays keyboards, guitars, drums and the vocoder on the album. The follow-up, Masterpiece Theater – Act II, was released in 2016, following the EP's lead single "Don't Play". Louis York is the first act on their artist collective and record label Weirdo Workshop, which is distributed by Sony-owned RED Distribution.

Awards

Discography

Louis York

As writer and producer

References

External links
 
Weirdo Workshop website

Singer-songwriters from Illinois
American pop musicians
Living people
1979 births
African-American male singer-songwriters
African-American record producers
Record producers from Illinois
People from East St. Louis, Illinois
Alabama State University alumni
21st-century African-American male singers
Singer-songwriters from Georgia (U.S. state)